Francis Flute is a character in William Shakespeare's A Midsummer Night's Dream. His occupation is a bellows-mender. He is forced to play the female role of Thisbe in "Pyramus and Thisbe", a play-within-the-play which is performed for Theseus' marriage celebration.

In the play Flute (Thisbe) speaks through the wall (played by Tom Snout) to Pyramus (Nick Bottom).

Flute is a young, excited actor who is disappointed when he finds he is meant to play a woman (Thisbe) in their interlude before the duke and the duchess. He generally is portrayed using a falsetto voice. He is an unsure actor who asks many questions.

Flute is often portrayed as the lowest in status of the Mechanicals, but his performance at the wedding of Theseus and Hippolyta arguably wins them favour at the court of the duke and duchess.

Flute's name, like that of the other mechanicals, is metonymical and derives from his craft: "Flute" references a church organ, an instrument prominently featuring the bellows a bellows-mender might be called upon to repair.

On the Elizabethan stage, the role of Flute and the other Mechanicals was intended to be doubled with Titania's four fairy escorts: Moth (also spelled Mote), Mustardseed, Cobweb, and Peaseblossom.

References

Sources

See also
 Mechanical (character)

Fictional artisans
Fictional actors
Male Shakespearean characters
Characters in A Midsummer Night's Dream
Literary characters introduced in 1596
Fictional Greek people